Pterolocera is a genus of moths of the Anthelidae family. The genus was erected by Francis Walker in 1855.

Species

 Pterolocera amplicornis Walker, 1855
 Pterolocera elizabetha (White, 1841)
 Pterolocera ferruginea Strand, [1926]
 Pterolocera ferrugineofusca Strand, [1926]
 Pterolocera insignis Herrich-Schäffer, [1856]
 Pterolocera isogama Turner, 1931
 Pterolocera leucocera (Turner, 1921)
 Pterolocera rubescens (Walker, 1865)

References

Anthelidae